The Revolutionary Communist Party of China is a Trotskyist political party based in Hong Kong. The party's members fled from Mainland China after the anti-Trotskyist Communist Party of China seized power in 1949, and its activities have since been limited to Hong Kong. Since 1974, the party has been legally active as the October Review, its official publication.

Performance in elections

Legislative Council elections

District Council elections

See also 
 Socialism in Hong Kong
 Socialist Action (Hong Kong)

References 

1948 establishments in China
Chinese democracy movements
Communist parties in China
Far-left politics in China
Political parties established in 1948
Political parties in China
Political parties in Hong Kong
Socialist parties in Hong Kong
Trotskyism in China
Trotskyist organizations in Asia